Operation Augurs of Prosperity (Arabic: Bashaer al-Kheir) was an Iraqi operation against insurgents in Diyala, north-east of Baghdad. The operation was launched on 29 July 2008 by elements of at least three Iraqi Army divisions, with four U.S. armored cavalry squadrons from the 3rd Armored Cavalry Regiment and the 2nd Stryker Cavalry Regiment in support. The U.S. led operation was designated Operation Iron Pursuit and consisted of three sub-operations: Sabre Pursuit, Eagle Pursuit and Bastogne Pursuit.

According to the Iraqi Ministry of Defence, the first phase of the operation was concluded on 11 August. Major-General Mohammed al-Askari reported that the Iraqi security forces had achieved half of the goals set for the operation. Al-Askari reported that 800 suspects had been arrested, including 42 Islamic State of Iraq leaders.

Background

In January 2008, U.S. forces throughout Iraq launched Operation Phantom Phoenix, a corps-level operation with a significant focus on Diyala. Despite a decrease in violence, partly attributable to Awakening Councils, groups formed by Sunni sheiks and supported by American forces, attacks remained at high levels. Many of these attacks were directed at the leaders of these groups.

Insurgents retained strongholds in the western desert regions of Diyala, in the foothills of the Hamrin mountains and around Lake Hamrin. These locations were a fall-back position for al-Qaida in Iraq and other insurgent groups and were targeted by U.S. special operations forces in the months leading up to the operation.

The operation
On 29 July, the Diyala Operational Command imposed a curfew throughout the province, restricting all unofficial vehicle movement, and a number of checkpoints were set up in the capital, Baqubah.

Iraqi forces conducted a number of house searches in Baqubah and Khan Bani Saad, 15 miles south of Baqubah.

On 31 July, Iraqi forces captured Abu Anas al-Baghdadi, Al-Qaeda in Iraq's media expert in the country, as well as four members of the Mujahideen Shura Council during a raid in western Diyala. Iraqi security forces lifted the curfew throughout the province.

On 2 August, the U.S. 3rd Armored Cavalry Regiment handed over responsibility for security in Balad Ruz, in the east of the province, to Iraqi security forces from the 18th brigade, 5th Iraqi Army Division, indicating that the region appears to have been cleared.

By 5 August, Iraqi forces had captured a number of key Al-Qaeda in Iraq leaders, including Qussai Ali Khalaf, the head of Islamic State of Iraq in Diyala; Adnan Gumer Mohammed, Basem al Safaah and Antisar Khudair, a woman suspected of recruiting female suicide bombers. According to U.S. forces, insurgents appeared to be fleeing from Diyala westwards towards Salah-ad-Din as Iraqi forces pushed up the Uzaym River valley. U.S. forces from the 1st Brigade, 101st Airborne Division, set up blocking positions in Salah-ad-Din to catch these insurgents. It also conducted a number of air assaults into known Al-Qaeda rear areas.

Aftermath
On 25 August, the insurgents struck back when a suicide bomber attacked a police recruiting station killing 35 recruits in Jalawla.

See also

 Diyala campaign

References

External links
 Map of Diyala province – Long War Journal
 July 30 MNF-I Press Briefing discussing the operation – Multi-National Force – Iraq

Military operations of the Iraq War in 2008
July 2008 events in Iraq
August 2008 events in Iraq